Eurovision Song Contest: The Story of Fire Saga is a 2020 American musical comedy film directed by David Dobkin, written by Will Ferrell and Andrew Steele, and starring Will Ferrell, Rachel McAdams, Dan Stevens, Melissanthi Mahut, Mikael Persbrandt, Ólafur Darri Ólafsson, Graham Norton, Demi Lovato, and Pierce Brosnan. The film follows the personally close Icelandic singers Lars Erickssong and Sigrit Ericksdóttir as they are given the chance to represent their country at the Eurovision Song Contest.

The Story of Fire Saga was originally scheduled for a May 2020 release on Netflix to coincide with the Eurovision Song Contest 2020. Due to the COVID-19 pandemic, the 2020 contest was cancelled, and the film was subsequently released a month later, on June 26. It received mixed reviews from critics, who praised the original music but criticised the screenplay and runtime, but was favourably received by many Eurovision fans. The film received a nomination for Best Original Song at the 93rd Academy Awards (for "Husavik").

Plot
In the small town of Húsavík, Iceland, Lars Erickssong and Sigrit Ericksdóttir, best friends since childhood, make music together as the band Fire Saga, much to the dismay of Lars' widowed father, Erick ("Volcano Man"). Lars has one dream: to win the Eurovision Song Contest. But at the local bar where they perform, the only song the audience wants to hear is the suggestive nonsense song "Ja Ja Ding Dong". Sigrit's mother also disapproves of their partnership, saying that Lars is holding Sigrit back, and that she will never hit the "Speorg note"—a note that can only be sung when being your truest self—when singing with him. The pair apply and are randomly selected to take part in Söngvakeppnin, the Icelandic pre-selection for Eurovision. Lars is so ecstatic about their participation that he rings the belltower, resulting in him being arrested by a policeman for falsely signalling an emergency. Lars, to his defense, states that the town is near death and that Fire Saga's participation in the contest is the only chance their town has to be alive. Sigrit convinces the police officers to free him. On the outskirts of town, Sigrit, who believes in the old Icelandic tradition of elves, asks the elves for help to get them into the contest in the hope that if Fire Saga wins, Lars will return Sigrit's romantic feelings for him.

Due to technical problems, Fire Saga's performance at Söngvakeppnin goes disastrously wrong ("Double Trouble"). Lars, dejected, declines to attend the boat party thrown for all the finalists and sits disappointed on the dock as Sigrit tries to comfort him. Suddenly, the boat explodes, killing everyone on board and leaving Fire Saga as the only surviving contestants and thus winners by default. Lars and Sigrit arrive in Edinburgh, Scotland, where Eurovision is being held ("Amar pelos dois"). Once there, Lars rebuffs Sigrit's attempts to kiss him, reiterating that they need to focus on the competition and not on their relationship. They struggle with a new remix of their song and Lars' elaborate staging plans. They meet Alexander Lemtov, a Russian singer who is a favorite to win the contest ("Lion of Love").

Alexander invites Lars and Sigrit to a party at his house, attended by numerous real-life former Eurovision contestants, where he introduces them both to the Greek contestant Mita Xenakis. They join the other contestants in a "Song-A-Long" (a mashup of "Believe", "Ray of Light", "Ne partez pas sans moi", "Waterloo" and "I Gotta Feeling"). Alexander and Sigrit spend the night together, as do Lars and Mita, although neither pair becomes intimate. At their rehearsal, Sigrit expresses her hate for the new clothing and remix and asks Lars to go back to the way things originally were. In response, Lars decides to change their clothing and revert their song to its original version. Later, back at the hotel, Lars overhears Sigrit working on a new song and presumes that it is a love song made for Alexander and that they are pursuing a romantic relationship.

Their semi-final performance of "Double Trouble" initially runs well, but is derailed by an accident involving Sigrit's scarf and a giant hamster wheel prop. They recover and finish the song, but are met with deafening silence and scattered laughter. Believing Fire Saga has become a laughing stock, they exit the stage, unaware that the crowd has erupted with applause for their persistence in finishing the performance. Sigrit pleads Lars to stay, but Lars angrily refuses; Sigrit then breaks up with Lars. Lars prepares to head back to Iceland, but not before telling Sigrit to go sing her love song for Alexander, upon which she reveals that she wrote it for Lars. Unaware that Fire Saga has been voted through to the final, Lars returns to Iceland to become a fisherman with his father.

Out at sea, Lars confesses his love for Sigrit to his father Erick, who convinces him to go back and fight for his love. Upon learning that Iceland is in the final, Lars immediately leaves. Meanwhile, Alexander sees an opportunity to establish a partnership with Sigrit, but she declines. Sigrit realizes that Alexander is gay but can't come out because of homophobia in Russia. Lars hitches a ride with Victor Karlosson (governor of the Central Bank of Iceland, and one of the Icelandic organizational team members), who attempts to murder Lars and reveals that he blew up the boat at Söngvakeppnin, for fear that Iceland would not be able to host Eurovision the following year if they win due to bankruptcy. Unseen elves save Lars by killing Victor with a thrown knife in the back, allowing Lars to make it back to the final in time. Interrupting their performance, he encourages Sigrit to ditch their official entry and perform the song she has written for him, "Húsavík". Lars starts playing the song on the piano, and Sigrit sings her song, culminating with a Speorg note, touching all of Iceland. Realising that they are in love with each other, Lars and Sigrit kiss each other on stage to a standing ovation in the audience. Backstage, Alexander is happy for them and accepts Mita's invitation to come to Greece with her in order to find his own happiness.

Fire Saga is disqualified for changing their song during the contest, but both Lars and Sigrit have lost interest in winning the competition, realizing that their relationship is more important. Back in Húsavík, Lars and Sigrit awake on the bus to a cheering crowd of locals. Some time later, Fire Saga is back to performing in the local bar, this time at the wedding reception of Lars’ father and Sigrit's mother. Bringing their newborn baby along, they ask if anyone wants to hear their Eurovision song, but the crowd once again demands "Ja Ja Ding Dong".

Cast

Appearances of Eurovision artists
Several former contestants of the Eurovision Song Contest made cameos in the film:

  John Lundvik – Swedish representative in 2019
  Anna Odobescu – Moldovan representative in 2019
  Bilal Hassani – French representative in 2019
  Loreen – Swedish winner of the 2012 contest
  Jessy Matador – French representative in 2010
  Alexander Rybak – Norwegian winner of the 2009 contest and representative in 2018
  Jamala – Ukrainian winner of the 2016 contest
  Elina Nechayeva – Estonian representative in 2018
  Conchita Wurst – Austrian winner of the 2014 contest
  Netta – Israeli winner of the 2018 contest

Other appearances include: 
  Salvador Sobral (2017 winner) as a busker playing piano in Scotland
   Molly Sandén (2006 Junior contestant) who dubbed Rachel McAdams in all Sigrit Ericksdóttir's songs.
   Petra Nielsen (Melodifestivalen 2004 contestant) who dubbed Melissanthi Mahut in Mita Xenakis' song.

Production
Will Ferrell was introduced to the Eurovision Song Contest in 1999 by his Swedish wife, actress Viveca Paulin. Sweden happened to win that year with the song "Take Me to Your Heaven", which Ferrell mentions as a reason he became invested in the competition.

In May 2018, in preparation for the film, Ferrell attended the final of the Eurovision Song Contest 2018 at the Altice Arena in Lisbon, Portugal, to research possible characters and scenarios for the film. He also spoke backstage with Eurovision contestants. On June 18, 2018, it was announced that Ferrell would star, co-write and produce a film inspired by the Eurovision Song Contest. The film would be distributed by Netflix.

In March 2019, David Dobkin signed on to direct the film. In May 2019, Rachel McAdams joined the cast. McAdams and Ferrell were spotted at the dress rehearsals for the Eurovision Song Contest 2019 in Tel Aviv, Israel, the stage of which was later rebuilt on a soundstage in London for the in-contest scenes, while plate shots were done with the real-life live audience back in Tel Aviv. In August 2019, Pierce Brosnan, Dan Stevens, and Demi Lovato, among others, joined the cast, with filming commencing in Edinburgh and Glasgow, Scotland, and in Iceland. Ferrell was pictured filming scenes at both the OVO Hydro, in Glasgow itself, and Glasgow Airport, in Abbotsinch, Paisley, in October 2019. Filming also took place at Warner Bros. Studios, Leavesden in England, making it the second Netflix feature to be filmed there, the first having been Mowgli: Legend of the Jungle. Knebworth House was used for the exterior shots of Alexander Lemtov's British house in the film.

The actors put on an Icelandic accent for the film. They trained with dialect coaches and McAdams studied videos of Icelandic singer Björk. Tabitha and Napoleon D'umo (known for So You Think You Can Dance) oversaw the choreography.

Production costs in Iceland were $3.6 million, out of which the Icelandic government paid close to a million dollars as a part of the country's movie production incentives.

Soundtrack

The soundtrack album for the film was released digitally on June 26, 2020, and the CD release followed on August 21, 2020. "Volcano Man" was the first song released from the album and features vocals from Will Ferrell and Swedish singer Molly Sandén (credited as My Marianne). According to Netflix, Sandén's vocals were mixed with McAdams' own voice for the tracks. In a separate phone call with Vanity Fair, the soundtrack's producer, Savan Kotecha, said that Sandén and McAdams' "tones worked so well together" that, in playing back certain tracks, he had a hard time differentiating between the vocals. The soundtrack was nominated for a Grammy Award for Best Compilation Soundtrack for Visual Media at the 63rd Annual Grammy Awards.

Track listing

Charts

Release

The Story of Fire Saga was digitally released by Netflix on June 26, 2020. In its first weekend, the film was the top-streamed item on Netflix in the United States and reached the No. 1 ranking position in multiple other regions as well. In its second weekend it fell to number eight on the site.

Reception
The site's critics consensus reads: "Eurovision Song Contest: The Story of Fire Saga contains inspired ingredients and laugh-out-loud moments but they're outnumbered by the flat stretches in this overlong comedy." On Metacritic, the film has a weighted average score of 50 out of 100, based on 39 critics, indicating "mixed or average reviews".

David Rooney of The Hollywood Reporter wrote: "If ever a comedy cried out for tight 85-minute treatment that keeps the gags pinging fast enough to disguise the thin sketch material at its core, it's this hit-or-miss two-hour feature." Owen Gleiberman of Variety called it "a badly shot one-joke movie that sits there and goes thud."
Chris Hewitt of Empire magazine wrote: "The votes are in and it's official: this largely unfunny paean to Eurovision is a waste of some serious talent. At least some of the songs are decent." Hewitt also complained about the length of the film: "It's all rather airless and lifeless and is at least half an hour too long." Robbie Collin of The Daily Telegraph wrote: "Sending up the Eurovision Song Contest is like flattening Salisbury Plain: one quick look at the thing should be enough to reassure you that the job took care of itself long ago. Nevertheless, Will Ferrell has decided to give it a shot and the result is this pulverisingly unfunny and vacuous two-hour gauntlet run of non-entertainment." Peter Bradshaw of The Guardian wrote: "The movie is not a disaster, just weirdly pointless". Bradshaw also criticizes the script saying it "pulls its punches" and the plot is borrowed from The Producers. Other writers noted plot similarities with the 1996 Father Ted episode "A Song for Europe".

Charlotte O'Sullivan of the Evening Standard gave the film a more positive review, praising the performances of McAdams and Stevens and writing that "Ferrell, who co-wrote the script, wisely realises that this institution is beyond parody and is simply content to pay homage. The result is extremely silly and ridiculously rousing." David Sims of The Atlantic praised the film's "chipper spirit" and wrote "this is a comedy that knows how to make fun and have fun." Kevin Maher of The Times concluded that "This might just be the most idiotic movie of the year so far. But joyously so."

Accolades

In popular culture
For the Eurovision Song Contest 2021, Hannes Óli Ágústsson reprised his role as Olaf Yohansson for the voting segment of the final, in which he presented the points on behalf of the Icelandic jury. In announcing Iceland's jury points, he attempted to give 12 points to "Ja Ja Ding Dong"; upon being told that it's impossible to do so, he reluctantly granted the points to  instead. The Finnish representatives Blind Channel also held up signs saying "PLAY JA JA DING DONG" in the green room during the televoting window.

In the same year, the Norwegian representative Tix gained publicity over showing affection for the Azerbaijani representative, Samira Efendi, throughout their time at the contest. Tix was seen singing "Ja Ja Ding Dong" as a love serenade for Efendi.

See also
 Iceland in the Eurovision Song Contest

References

External links
 
 

English-language Netflix original films
Gary Sanchez Productions films
Films about the Eurovision Song Contest
Films scored by Atli Örvarsson
Films postponed due to the COVID-19 pandemic
American comedy films
Films about musical groups
Films directed by David Dobkin
Films set in 1974
Films set in 2020
Films set in Edinburgh
Films set in Iceland
Films set in Reykjavík
Films shot in Edinburgh
Films shot in Glasgow
Films shot in Iceland
Films shot in Israel
Films shot at Warner Bros. Studios, Leavesden
Films shot in Hertfordshire
Albums produced by Johan Carlsson
2020s English-language films
2020s American films